Valzin en Petite Montagne is a commune in the department of Jura, eastern France. The municipality was established on 1 January 2017 by merger of the former communes of Légna (the seat), Chatonnay, Fétigny and Savigna.

See also 
Communes of the Jura department

References 

Communes of Jura (department)